= Ivy Cohen =

American marketing executive

Ivy Gwen Cohen is an American entrepreneur and public policy advocate with a background in brand marketing. She is the founder of the strategic communications and public relations firm Ivy Cohen Corporate Communications, where she is president and CEO. Cohen is also known for her ten-year tenure as the CEO of the national youth drug prevention organization "Just Say No" International.

== Life and career ==
Cohen grew up in Brooklyn, NY and Beverly Hills, CA. After receiving her Bachelor of Arts from University of California, Berkeley and MBA from Georgetown University, Cohen began her business career in brand management at Procter & Gamble.

From 1987-1997, Cohen was president and CEO of "Just Say No" International, a drug abuse prevention organization. Her work with “Just Say No” included creating and implementing programs for youth, as well as advising on federal drug policy during the Reagan, Bush Sr. and Clinton administrations. First Lady Nancy Reagan served as the organization’s honorary chair.

She later transitioned to corporate communications, managing public and investor relations for digital brands, including SelfCare.com and JDPower.com. Cohen established her own agency, Ivy Cohen Corporate Communications (ICCC) in 2001.

== Civic engagement ==
Among her civic involvements, Cohen spent 16 years on the board of YouthBridge-New York, a teen diversity leadership program in New York City. In 2005, she co-founded P.S. 247’s College Partnership Program, an early-intervention educational initiative. In 2009, she earned the PENCIL Innovative Partnership Award for her work as a corporate partner to P.S. 247.
